Weilite (CaHAsO4) is a rare arsenate mineral. It is a translucent white triclinic mineral with a waxy luster.

It was first described in 1963 for occurrences in Gabe Gottes Mine, Haut-Rhin, Alsace, France; Wittichen, Schenkenzell, Black Forest, Baden-Württemberg, Germany; and the Schneeberg District, Erzgebirge, Saxony, Germany. It is named after French mineralogist René Weil of the University of Strasbourg. It occurs in the oxidized zone of arsenic-bearing hydrothermal veins. It occurs as an alteration product of pharmacolite and haidingerite.

References 

Arsenate minerals
Calcium minerals
Triclinic minerals
Minerals in space group 2